Olympic Trap is a shooting sport discipline contested at the Olympic Games and sanctioned by the International Shooting Sport Federation. Usually referred to simply as "trap", the discipline is also known in the United States as international trap, bunker trap, trench or international clay pigeon. It is considered more difficult than most other trap versions in that the distance to the targets and the speed with which they are thrown are both greater.

Until 1992, the Olympic trap event was open to both men and women. In 1996, it was open to men only, and from 2000 men and women have had separate competitions.

The course of fire is 125 targets in the qualification round for both men and women since 2018. In 2005, the final rules were changed so that only one shot can be taken at each target, as opposed to two in the qualification round. The competitors use shotguns of 12 bore or smaller. Allowed are all actions, including double barrel breech loaders, semi-automatic or others, but not pump action guns.

Olympic Games 

Until 1992, trap was open to both men and women. In 1996, there was no women's trap event, and since 2000, women and men have had separate events in the Olympics.

Mixed / Men's Trap

Women's Trap

World Championships, Men

World Championships, Men Team

World Championships, Women

World Championships, Women Team

World Championships, Mixed Team 

Following the 2016 Rio Olympics, the ISSF created a new event, Mixed Team Trap. The mixed team consists of one male and one female shooter. During the qualification rounds, each team is squadded with two other teams and each shooter shoots 25 targets per round, just as in the individual event. This continues for 3 rounds (75 targets per shooter, 150 targets per team). The finals are contested between the top 6 teams. Shooters take turns shooting 5 targets each (1 rotation) for 5 rotations (25 targets), at which time the lowest scoring is eliminated. Another team is eliminated each 5 targets until the final two teams are left. The final two teams shoot 10 targets to determine a winner, for a total of 50 targets in the finals.

The first World Championship for Mixed Team was held at the 2017 World Shotgun Championships in Moscow, RUS.

Junior World Championships, Men

Junior World Championships, Women

Junior World Championships, Mixed Team

World Championships, total medals

Current world records

See also
ISSF shooting events
ISSF Olympic skeet
Double trap

References

External links

ISSF shooting events
Shotgun shooting sports
Rifle and pistol shooting sports
Clay pigeon shooting
Lists of sport shooters